Fyodor Semyonovich Bogorodsky (2 June 1895 – 3 November 1959) was a well-known artist in the Soviet Union, and a proponent of the Association of Artists of Revolutionary Russia (AKhRR).

In the 1920s Bogorodsky participated in the "Fire-color" Association, which also consisted of Arkhipov, Zhekulina, Dobuzhinsky, Petrov-Vodkin, Voloshin, and other major artists of the time.

His 1945 painting, Glory to Fallen Heroes, won the Stalin Prize, and appeared on a 1965 Soviet postage stamp.

References

1895 births
1959 deaths
Communist Party of the Soviet Union members
Stalin Prize winners
Recipients of the Order of the Red Banner of Labour
Soviet artists

Burials at Novodevichy Cemetery